The 1968–69 Uganda National First Division League was the first season of the Ugandan football championship, the top-level football league of Uganda.

Overview
The 1968–69 Uganda National First Division League was contested by 8 teams and was won by Prisons.

League standings

References

External links
 Uganda - List of Champions - RSSSF (Hans Schöggl)
 Ugandan Football League Tables - League321.com

Ugandan Super League seasons
Uganda
Football
Football